Z32 was a German Type 1936A (Mob) destroyer, which was completed in 1942 and which served with the 8th Destroyer Flotilla of the Kriegsmarine during the Second World War. She fought in the Battle of the Bay of Biscay against HMS Glasgow and HMS Enterprise, alongside the German 8th Destroyer Flotilla and the 4th Torpedo Boat Flotilla. She mainly operated from German-occupied French Atlantic ports, escorting blockade runners and U-boats, and was sunk during the Battle of Ushant on 9 June 1944.

Construction and design
On 28 June 1939, Nazi Germany placed orders for nine destroyers (Z31–Z39) of the new Type 1938B class. A further three destroyers of the class were ordered in July. The Type 1938B destroyers were relatively small, compared with the preceding Type 1936 and 1936A ships. They were to be armed with four  guns in two twin turrets, and were designed for long range. Following the outbreak of the Second World War, however, orders for the Type 1938B destroyers were cancelled; Germany reverted to the Type 1936A (Mob) class, a slightly modified version of the previous Type 1936A class. On 9 September 1939, four destroyers (Z31–Z34) were re-ordered from the Deschimag consortium, to be built at the AG Weser shipyard in Bremen. A further three ships (Z37–Z39) were ordered from the Germaniawerft yard. Z32 was laid down on 1 November 1940 (with a yard number of 1002), launched on 15 August 1941 and commissioned on 15 September 1942.

Her displacement was  standard and  full load. The ship had a complement of 321 officers and ratings.

Z32s main armaments were five 15 cm (5.9in) TbtsK C/36 naval guns, with one twin turret forward and three single mounts aft. Z32 was the first ship of her class to be completely fitted with the armament, as development of the twin turret had been slow. Her anti-aircraft armament consisted of two twin 3.7 cm SK C/30 anti-aircraft guns (later replaced by automatic Flak M42 guns) and nine 2 cm cannon in one quadruple and five single mounts. A second quadruple 2 cm mount was fitted forward of the ship's bridge in 1943, replacing one of the single mounts. Eight 53.3 cm (21 in) torpedo tubes in two quadruple mounts were fitted, and up to sixty mines could be carried.

Service
After commissioning and work up, Z32 joined the 8th Destroyer Flotilla, which was transferred via the English channel to the French Atlantic coast in Operation Karin from 5–8 March 1943. Despite being fired upon off the coast of Dover by British artillery, the Flotilla reached Bordeaux unscathed on 8 March. On 28 March, Z32 was one of four destroyers that formed the distant escort for the Italian blockade runner Himalaya. They set out from Bordeaux for the Far East, with nine torpedo boats providing a close escort, but the force turned back when it was spotted by British air reconnaissance. Heavy British air attacks were repelled, but Pietro Orseolo was damaged by a torpedo from the American submarine , before reaching safety in the Gironde estuary on 2 April. On 9 April, Z32 provided cover for the Himalaya during her breakout attempt, but they were foiled once again by British air attacks. The Z32s other operations included covering German U-boats departing from and returning to their French bases.

On 24 December 1943, the 8th Destroyer Flotilla, consisting of six destroyers including Z32, and the 4th Torpedo Boat Flotilla, comprising six torpedo boats, set out to meet the blockade runner Osorno, meeting her on 25 December. They managed to escort Osorno to the Gironde despite heavy air attacks, but Orsono struck a submerged wreck and had to be beached to save her cargo. On 26 December, the 8th Destroyer Flotilla (again including Z32) and the 4th Torpedo Boat Flotilla set out again to meet another inbound blockade runner, Alsterufer. Unknown to the Germans, Alsterufer was attacked on 27 December by a B-24 Liberator bomber of No. 311 (Czechoslovak) Squadron RAF, set on fire and abandoned by her crew. The German forces attempted a pincer manoeuvre, but this was prevented by the heavy seas. Z33 fired six torpedoes at the British cruisers, all of which missed.

On 30 January 1944, as Z32 was carrying out exercises with Z23 and Z37 in the south of the Bay of Biscay, she collided with Z37. Z32 sustained damage to her degaussing system and suffered a fire on her forecastle, caused by loose ready-use anti-aircraft ammunition. Meanwhile, one of Z37s torpedoes exploded, starting a fire and causing flooding. Z32 was under repair until 2 May. Z37 considered to be beyond economical repair, and was disarmed. Z32 was damaged again on 5 May after running aground, and underwent repairs for another month.

On 6 June 1944, following the Normandy landings, the 8th Destroyer Flotilla, consisting of the destroyers Z32, Z24,  and the torpedo boat , set off for Brest for operations against the invasion fleet. They were attacked by British aircraft during their journey, with Z32 damaged by British rockets. On 8 and 9 June, the four ships set out from Brest for Cherbourg, but were intercepted by eight Allied destroyers in the Battle of Ushant. She ran aground and was wrecked on the Île de Batz. The other two German ships escaped back to Cherbourg, while the British destroyer  was damaged.

References

Bibliography

Further reading

1941 ships
Ships built in Bremen (state)
Type 1936A-class destroyers
Maritime incidents in June 1944
Shipwrecks in the Bay of Biscay
World War II shipwrecks in the Atlantic Ocean